Bardzruni is a village in the Vayk Municipality of the Vayots Dzor Province of Armenia. The village is located close to the Armenia–Azerbaijan border.

Etymology 
The village was previously known as Sultanbek.

Gallery

References

External links 

 
 
 

Populated places in Vayots Dzor Province